Alangalang National High School is a high school in Alangalang municipality, Leyte province, Philippines, formerly known as Alangalang Municipal High School.

Education Programs
There are two education programs available:
Regular Education
Special Science Class

See also
Palo National High School

References

High schools in Leyte (province)